Yaser Salem Bagharab (born 1 January 1998) is a Yemen-born middle and long distance runner. Since 2017 he competes for Qatar, mostly in the 3000 m steeplechase. In this event he won silver medals at the 2017 Asian Championships and 2018 Asian Games.

He represented Yemen in the junior race at the 2015 IAAF World Cross Country Championships.

References

1998 births
Living people
Qatari male steeplechase runners
Qatari male long-distance runners
Yemeni male steeplechase runners
Yemeni male long-distance runners
Yemeni male cross country runners
Asian Games silver medalists for Qatar
Asian Games medalists in athletics (track and field)
Athletes (track and field) at the 2018 Asian Games
Medalists at the 2018 Asian Games
Yemeni emigrants to Qatar